Vähälä is a Finnish surname. Notable people with the surname include:

Elina Vähälä (born 1975), Finnish classical violinist
Kerry Vahala, American engineer

Finnish-language surnames